The 1994 United States Senate election in Mississippi was held November 7, 1994. Incumbent Republican U.S. Senator Trent Lott won re-election to a second term.

Major candidates

Democratic 
 Ken Harper, former State Senator and Attorney
 Shawn O'Hara

Republican 
 Trent Lott, incumbent U.S. Senator

Results

See also 
 1994 United States Senate elections

References 

1994
Mississippi
1994 Mississippi elections